was the fourth ruler of Northern Fujiwara in Mutsu Province, Japan, the second son of Hidehira.

At first protecting Yoshitsune, according to his father's will, he was finally forced by Minamoto no Yoritomo to attack Yoshitsune.  Yoshitsune, rather than surrender, killed his wife and children and committed suicide. In 1189 Yasuhira was defeated by Yoritomo's forces and subsequently killed in Nienosaku, Hinai District.  This marked the end of the Northern Fujiwara.

A casket purportedly containing the head of Fujiwara no Yasuhira is housed within the Konjiki-dō at Chūson-ji in Iwate Prefecture.

References

1155 births
1189 deaths
Ōshu-Fujiwara clan
People of Heian-period Japan
People of Kamakura-period Japan